is a passenger railway station in the town of Hokota, Ibaraki Prefecture, Japan operated by the third sector Kashima Rinkai Railway.

Lines
Tokushuku Station is served by the Kashima Rinkai Railway’s Ōarai Kashima Line, and is located 26.7 km from the official starting point of the line at Mito Station.

Station layout
The station consists of a single side platform serving traffic in both directions. There is no station building, but only a waiting shelter, and the station is unattended.

History
Tokushuku Station was opened on 14 March 1985 with the opening of the Ōarai Kashima Line.

Passenger statistics
In fiscal 2015, the station was used by an average of 71 passengers daily.

Surrounding area
 Tokushuku Post Office

See also
 List of railway stations in Japan

References

External links

  Kashima Rinkai Testudo Station Information 

Railway stations in Ibaraki Prefecture
Railway stations in Japan opened in 1985
Hokota, Ibaraki